Matthew Woo Ling (born 15 September 1996) is a Trinidadian footballer who plays as a midfielder for Dalvík/Reynir.

Career statistics

Club

Notes

International

References

External links

 Matthew Woo Ling at the Iowa Western Community College

1996 births
Living people
Iowa Western Reivers men's soccer players
Trinidad and Tobago footballers
Trinidad and Tobago youth international footballers
Trinidad and Tobago international footballers
Trinidad and Tobago expatriate footballers
Association football midfielders
W Connection F.C. players
Peachtree City MOBA players
St. Andrews F.C. players
North East Stars F.C. players
USL League Two players
Maltese Premier League players
Trinidad and Tobago expatriate sportspeople in the United States
Expatriate soccer players in the United States
Trinidad and Tobago expatriate sportspeople in Malta
Expatriate footballers in Malta
2015 CONCACAF U-20 Championship players
Trinidad and Tobago people of Chinese descent
Dalvík/Reynir players
Expatriate footballers in Iceland
3. deild karla players